See also Frederik Winkel-Horn (1756-1837)

Frederik Winkel Horn (19 July 1845 – 17 November 1898), was a  Danish historian and translator, originally an archaeologist.

Works
 Mennesket i forhistorisk tid, 1874 (culture in the old norse time)
 Nordiske heltesagaer, 1876 (Norse saga)
 Peder Syv, 1878 (study of Peder Syv) PhD dissertation
 Den danske litteraturs historie, 2 vol., 1881 (Danish literature history)
 Dansk Læsebog for skolernes mellemste og højere klasser, 1883 (Co-authored with Otto Borchsenius)
 Grundtvigs liv og gerning, 1883 (biography of N. F. S. Grundtvig)
 Jomsvikingerne, 1895 (Saga history of scandianvian)

Translations (to Danish)
 Den ældre Edda, 1869 (The poetic Edda)
 Billeder af livet paa Island, 3 vol., 1871-1876 (the Iceland sagas)
 E. Bellamy, Anno 2000-1889, 1889 (Novel)
 Saxo Grammaticus, Danmarks historie, 1896-1898 (Gesta Danorum)
 Ludvig Holbergs levnedsbreve, 1897 (about Ludvig Holberg)
 Michael Kohlhas og andre Fortaellinger, 1897 (about Michael Kohlhas)

1845 births
1898 deaths
19th-century Danish historians